Sindhura is a raga in Hindustani classical music.

Theory
Arohana: 

Avarohana: 

Vadi: 

Samavadi:

Notes

References

Sources
 

Hindustani ragas